Rada Iveković (born 1945 in Zagreb, Yugoslavia) is a Croatian professor, philosopher, Indologist, and writer.

Research 
Iveković's research interests include comparative philosophy (Asian philosophy, particularly Indian, and Western), feminist theory and feminist philosophy as well as political philosophy.

In particular, the following aspects have been of intellectual inspiration for Iveković's work:  contemporary European philosophy, postmodern philosophy, Orientalism in (Western) philosophy, the feminine in philosophy, issues of nation, state und citizenship, problems of nationalism, of violence and war, European identity issues, and democracy.

Iveković's other interests include: literary theory and literary criticism, religion and mythology, gender studies and women writers, anthropology, and  contemporary French philosophy in particular.

Political positioning 
Iveković holds that the inequality of the sexes (Inégalité des sexes) and other alterities, inequalities, exclusions, subordinating inclusions (e.g. through discrimination by  gender, national citizenship, ethnicity, colonization) leads to a fatal partitioning of reason ("Le partage de la raison"). On the war events on the territory of Yugoslavia she takes an explicitly anti-patriarchal, anti-racist and non-nationalist stance.

In 1997 Iveković published a study on gender/sex in philosophy, taking issue with Jean-François Lyotard.

In 2017, Iveković has signed the Declaration on the Common Language of the Croats, Serbs, Bosniaks and Montenegrins.

Career 
Iveković grew up mostly in Zagreb and Belgrade, living in Zagreb, from 1963 until leaving Croatia for exile in 1991-1992 in a self-described "protest against nationalism."

At Zagreb University, she studied Indology, Philosophy and English Studies (1969) and from 1970 to 1973, Buddhist philosophy at Delhi University where she received her PhD in 1972.

From 1975 to 1991-1992, Iveković was a lecturer in the History of Asian Philosophy and Comparative Philosophy at Zagreb University. From 1998-2003 she was a professor at Paris VIII. Since 2003 Professor in the Department of Sociology at University Jean Monnet - St. Etienne and after 2004, the Program Director at Collège international de philosophie (Paris).

Selected works in English 
1984: She and Slavenka Drakulić-Illić contributed the piece "Neofeminism, and its six mortal sins" to the 1984 anthology Sisterhood Is Global: The International Women's Movement Anthology, edited by Robin Morgan.
2004: "COMMENTARY - The Veil in France: Secularism, Nation, Women". Economic and Political Weekly. Vol. 39, 11, 1117-1119.
2005: "Borders and Partitions: Exception as Space and Time" (Abstract for the conference Polemos, Stasis ... War, Civil War, 24–27 June 2005, National Chiao Tung University, Taiwan: Center for Humanities and Social Theory). 
2005: "The Fiction of Gender Constructing the Fiction of Nation: On How Fictions Are Normative, and Norms Produce Exceptions". Anthropological Yearbook of European Cultures 2005 (Gender and Nation in South Eastern Europe), 19-38.

Sources 

Most comprehensive CV, until 2004, in English
Short portrait in German with photo,  1997

Further reading
Grebowicz, Margret. Gender after Lyotard. Albany: State University of New York Press, 2007.

1945 births
Living people
Buddhist feminists
Croatian scholars of Buddhism
Croatian Buddhists
Croatian feminists
Croatian women writers
Feminist philosophers
Indologists
Academic staff of the University of Zagreb
Political philosophers
Postmodern feminists
University of Belgrade Faculty of Philosophy alumni
20th-century Croatian philosophers
21st-century Croatian philosophers
Croatian women philosophers
20th-century Croatian women writers
20th-century Croatian writers
21st-century Croatian women writers
Women orientalists
Signatories of the Declaration on the Common Language
Croatian emigrants to France